William Robert Lawley Jr. (August 23, 1920 – May 30, 1999) was a United States Army Air Forces officer and a recipient of the United States military's highest decoration—the Medal of Honor—for his actions in World War II.

Biography
Lawley joined the Army Air Forces from Birmingham, Alabama in April 1942, and by February 20, 1944, was a first lieutenant serving as a pilot in the 364th Bomb Squadron, 305th Bomb Group. On that day, during a bombing mission over Nazi-controlled Europe, his B-17 Flying Fortress came under attack by enemy fighter aircraft. With his plane severely damaged and on fire, he ordered his crew to parachute to safety. Finding that two crewmen were too badly injured to bail out, Lawley chose to remain in the aircraft and, despite his own serious wounds, attempt to pilot it into friendly territory. Although weakened from loss of blood and shock, he was able to make a successful crash landing in England. Lawley recovered from his wounds and, on August 8, 1944, was awarded the Medal of Honor.

Lawley reached the rank of colonel before leaving the Air Force in 1972. He died at age 78 and was buried in Greenwood Cemetery, Montgomery, Alabama.

Medal of Honor citation
Lawley's official Medal of Honor citation reads:
For conspicuous gallantry and intrepidity in action above and beyond the call of duty, 20 February 1944, while serving as pilot of a B-17 aircraft on a heavy bombardment mission over enemy-occupied continental Europe. Coming off the target he was attacked by approximately 20 enemy fighters, shot out of formation, and his plane severely crippled. Eight crewmembers were wounded, the copilot was killed by a 20-mm. shell. One engine was on fire, the controls shot away, and 1st Lt. Lawley seriously and painfully wounded about the face. Forcing the copilot's body off the controls, he brought the plane out of a steep dive, flying with his left hand only. Blood covered the instruments and windshield and visibility was impossible. With a full bomb load the plane was difficult to maneuver and bombs could not be released because the racks were frozen. After the order to bail out had been given, 1 of the waist gunners informed the pilot that 2 crewmembers were so severely wounded that it would be impossible for them to bail out. With the fire in the engine spreading, the danger of an explosion was imminent. Because of the helpless condition of his wounded crewmembers 1st Lt. Lawley elected to remain with the ship and bring them to safety if it was humanly possible, giving the other crewmembers the option of bailing out. Enemy fighters again attacked but by using masterful evasive action he managed to lose them. One engine again caught on fire and was extinguished by skillful flying. 1st Lt. Lawley remained at his post, refusing first aid until he collapsed from sheer exhaustion caused by loss of blood, shock, and the energy he had expended in keeping control of his plane. He was revived by the bombardier and again took over the controls. Coming over the English coast 1 engine ran out of gasoline and had to be feathered. Another engine started to burn and continued to do so until a successful crash landing was made on a small fighter base. Through his heroism and exceptional flying skill, 1st Lt. Lawley rendered outstanding distinguished and valorous service to our Nation.

See also

List of Medal of Honor recipients for World War II

References

External links

1920 births
1999 deaths
United States Army Air Forces Medal of Honor recipients
United States Air Force officers
United States Army Air Forces officers
United States Army Air Forces pilots of World War II
People from Leeds, Alabama
World War II recipients of the Medal of Honor